Association Sportive des Minguettes Vénissieux is a French association football club founded in 1969. They are based in the town of Vénissieux and their home stadium is the Stade Laurent Gerin. As of the 2009–10 season, they play in the Championnat de France amateur 2 Group D.

External links
ASM Vénissieux at fff.fr 

Venissieux
1969 establishments in France
Sport in Lyon Metropolis
Football clubs in Auvergne-Rhône-Alpes